The Toyota K platform, informally known as the Toyota Camry platform, is a front-wheel-drive automobile platform (also adaptable to four-wheel-drive) that has underpinned various Toyota and Lexus models from the mid-size category upwards since September 1999, starting with the Avalon (XX20).   Besides the Camry, the K platform was used on minivans, crossovers and luxury sedans.  This platform was larger than the front-wheel-drive MC and New MC platforms, but less upscale than the N and New N platforms designed for rear-wheel drive luxury applications. Starting with the XV70 Toyota Camry (2017), the new K platform (TNGA-K) is part of the Toyota New Global Architecture (TNGA).

Features 
 It is a front-wheel drive platform, with optional four-wheel drive.
 Four-wheel drive variants use either:
 V-Flex II system, which is a viscous-coupling torque-on-demand unit (on most models); or
 Symmetric full-time four-wheel drive (on Lexus RX and Highlander)
 e-FOUR system (rear wheels are driven by electric motors) on hybrid models.
 Engines are mounted transversely.
 MacPherson struts are used in suspension at all four corners with the exception of the Alphard and Previa, which uses a twist-beam rear suspension.

Applications 
 Toyota Avalon — XX20 (1999–2004), XX10 (for Australia, 2000–2005), XX30 (2004–2012), XX40 (2012–2018)
 Toyota Pronard — XX20 (2000–2004) 
 Toyota X Runner — XX10 (concept car, 2003) 
 Toyota Camry — XV30 (2001–2006), XV40 (2006–2011), XV50 (2011–2017)
 Toyota Camry Solara — XV30 (2003–2009)
 Toyota Aurion — XV40 (2006–2011), XV50 (2011–2017)
 Toyota Highlander/Kluger — XU20 (2000–2007), XU40 (2007–2013), XU50 (2013–2019)
 Toyota Previa/Estima/Tarago — XR30, XR40 (2000–2005)
 Toyota Alphard — AH10 (2002–2008)
 Toyota Sienna — XL20 (2003–2009), XL30 (2010–2020)
 Toyota Venza — AV10 (2008–2017)
 Lexus ES — XV30 (2001–2006), XV40 (2006–2012), XV60 (2012–2018)
 Toyota Windom — XV30 (2001–2006) 
 Lexus RX — XU30 (2003–2008), AL10 (2008–2015), AL20 (2015–2022)
 Toyota Harrier — XU30 (2003–2013)

References 

K